Melville Monument is an island in the Avannaata municipality, NW Greenland.

It was named "Melville Monument" by Arctic explorer Sir John Ross in July 1818.

The island is located in Melville Bay, separated from the coast by a narrow sound. It is a peaked island, familiar to Arctic navigators, similar to Kullorsuaq further south, but smaller.


Literature 
Clements R. Markham, Life of Admiral Sir Leopold McClintock,
T. C. Chamberlin, Glacial Studies in Greenland. III. Coast Glaciers between Disco Island and Inglefield Gulf

See also
List of islands of Greenland

References

External links
Seabird colonies in the Melville Bay, Northwest Greenland
Islands of Greenland